Philautus petilus is a species of frogs in the family Rhacophoridae.

It is endemic to Laos.

Its natural habitat is subtropical or tropical moist lowland forests.

References

Amphibians of Laos
petilus
Endemic fauna of Laos
Frogs of Asia
Amphibians described in 2004
Taxonomy articles created by Polbot
Taxobox binomials not recognized by IUCN